Lindani Ndwandwe (born 26 February 1975) is a South African professional golfer.

Golf career 
Ndwandwe grew up in Nongoma, KwaZulu-Natal. He was introduced to the game by his brother Mandla who would use sticks and bottles as golf clubs and golf balls. He honed his skills as a caddie at Durban Country Club and Beachwood Golf Club.

In 1997, Ndwandwe won two elite amateur events, the Natal Match Play and Natal Stroke Play events. He turned pro two years later and qualified for the Sunshine Tour in 2000.

Ndwandwe won the 2001 Western Cape Classic by a stroke over Richard Kaplan. He was the second black man to win on the Sunshine Tour. He recorded a number of runner-up finishes through the decade but would not win again until the 2009 Highveld Classic.

Ndwandwe has four children.

Professional wins (2)

Sunshine Tour wins (2)

Sunshine Tour playoff record (1–1)

References

External links

South African male golfers
Sunshine Tour golfers
People from Zululand District Municipality
Sportspeople from Durban
1975 births
living people